Thomas Lincoln (1778–1851) was the father of Abraham Lincoln.

Thomas Lincoln may also refer to:
Tad Lincoln (1853–1871), the youngest son of Abraham Lincoln
Thomas Lincoln, Jr. (1812–1812), the younger brother of Abraham Lincoln

See also
Thomas Lincoln Casey Sr.
Thomas Lincoln Casey Jr.
Thomas Lincoln Tally
Thomas Lincoln Mullins